Elias Earle (June 19, 1762May 19, 1823) was a United States representative from South Carolina. Born in Frederick County in the Colony of Virginia, he attended private school and moved to Greenville County, South Carolina, in September 1787. He was one of the earliest ironmasters of the South, and prospected and negotiated in the iron region of Georgia.

Earle was a member of the South Carolina House of Representatives from 1794 to 1797 and was a member of the South Carolina Senate in 1800. He was elected as a Democratic-Republican to the Ninth Congress (March 4, 1805 – March 3, 1807), was elected to the Twelfth and Thirteenth Congresses (March 4, 1811 – March 3, 1815), and was again elected to the Fifteenth and Sixteenth Congresses (March 4, 1817 – March 3, 1821). He died in Centerville, South Carolina, in 1823; interment was in Old Earle Cemetery, Buncombe Road, Greenville, South Carolina.

Family

Elias Earle was the son of Samuel Earle III, member of the Virginia House of Burgesses from 1742-1747, (1692 Westmoreland County, Virginia - 1771 Warren County, Virginia) and
Elizabeth Holdbrook. Elias was married to Frances Wilton Robinson (March 26, 1762  in Virginia - September 12, 1823) on September 17, 1782 in King George County, Virginia. She was the daughter of Gerard Robinson (1725 - 1770) and Elizabeth Monteith.

Elias Earle's nephews, Samuel Earle and John Baylis Earle, as well as great-grandsons John Laurens Manning Irby and Joseph Haynsworth Earle, were also members of the U.S. Congress.

His home, the Earle Town House, was added to the National Register of Historic Places in 1969.  His estate property was developed between about 1915 and 1930, and in 1982 designated the Col. Elias Earle Historic District.

References

1762 births
1823 deaths
People from Frederick County, Virginia
Members of the South Carolina House of Representatives
South Carolina state senators
Democratic-Republican Party members of the United States House of Representatives from South Carolina
American ironmasters